Sauteria spongiosa is a species of liverwort in the Cleveaceae family. It is endemic to India.

References 

Marchantiales
Flora of West Himalaya
Flora of Uttar Pradesh
Least concern plants
Taxonomy articles created by Polbot